Scythris tytrella is a moth species of the family Scythrididae. The species was first described by Mark I. Falkovitsh in 1969; the first description of the female genitalia occurred in 2009 by Kari Nupponen. It is found in Kazakhstan and Uzbekistan.

References

tytrella
Moths described in 1969
Moths of Asia